= Gulf Center for Democratic Development =

The Gulf Center for Democratic Development (In Arabic: مركز الخليج لتنمية الديمقراطية) is a non-governmental organization and a training and information institution dedicated to promoting and instilling democratic values in the member states of the Gulf Cooperation Council, as defined in the International Bill of Human Rights. It is headquartered in London, United Kingdom. Its current secretary-general is Dr. Salah Al-Bandar.

In September 2006, the Center released a document revealing an alleged political plot within the Government of Bahrain to marginalize its Shia population and manipulate elections. The scandal became known as the Al-Bandar Report (also known as the Bandar Report).
